Captain Charles William Cudemore  (born 19 November 1897, date of death unknown but possibly 1967) was a World War I flying ace credited with 15 aerial victories.

World War I service
Cudemore was transferred from the Shropshire Light Infantry as a second lieutenant on 21 June 1915. He opened his victory roll when he and Robert Hall shot down an observation balloon on 7 May 1917; Cudemore then promptly shot down another balloon single-handed. After his transfer from 40 Squadron to 29 Squadron, Cudemore continued to fly a Nieuport in his next three triumphs; he became an ace on 3 September 1917. He was promoted from temporary second lieutenant to temporary lieutenant effective 1 July 1917. He received the Military Cross on 16 October.

There was a lapse in his scoring until 11 August 1918, when he flew a 64 Squadron S.E.5a to a win over a Fokker D.VII, which was driven down out of control. He continued to score through 9 November 1918. A summary of his final results is he destroyed three enemy fighter planes and two observation balloons, and drove down ten enemy planes out of control.

Post war service and life
On 3 June 1919, Cudemore was awarded the Distinguished Flying Cross. On 8 March 1925, he was appointed flying officer in the RAF. Also in 1925, he was sued for divorce by Carolyn Alice Cudemore. On 15 October 1925, he was transferred to the Class A Reserve.

On 3 September 1939, Cudemore was promoted from flying officer to flight lieutenant in the RAF Reserve.

Honors and awards
Military Cross (MC)

T./2nd Lt. Charles William Cudemore, Gen. list and R.F.C.

For conspicuous gallantry and devotion to duty in attacking enemy aircraft and kite balloons. He has brought down at least three enemy machines and three kite balloons, and has taken part in numerous other engagements. He has consistently set a very fine example of pluck and determination in all his attacks.

Notes

References
 Nieuport Aces of World War 1. Norman Franks. Osprey Publishing, 2000. , .
 SE 5/5a Aces of World War I. Norman Franks. Osprey Publishing, 2007. , 9781846031809.

1897 births
Year of death missing
British World War I flying aces